La Mirada High School is a public high school in La Mirada, California. It is a member school of the Norwalk-La Mirada Unified School District which was built in 1960 as one of three high schools in the district.  After the Norwalk/La Mirada School District voted to close William N. Neff High School in 1980,  Neff High School students began attending La Mirada High School in the Fall of 1981. Since then, La Mirada High School has been the only high school in La Mirada.

Description
The school's buildings are arranged in a circular position due to the limited amount of space at its location. The school also contains a full sized football field with an athlete standard running track. The campus also features both baseball and softball fields. It is one of a handful of high school tracks equipped to run the steeplechase, and it shares that resource with Biola University.

Notable alumni
 Tony Brown (2016), NFL Player
 Jennie Finch (1998), former softball pitcher for University of Arizona and Team USA
 Gabrielle LeDoux (1966), lawyer and member of Alaska House of Representatives
 Keith McGill (2007), cornerback for Oakland Raiders, selected 116th overall in 2014 NFL Draft
 Amber Riley (2004), actress and singer best known for her role on television series Glee as Mercedes Jones
 Ryan Vargas, NASCAR driver
 Derrick Williams (2009), basketball player with Maccabi Tel Aviv of the Israeli Basketball Premier League and the EuroLeague; formerly with five NBA teams; second overall pick in 2011 NBA Draft
 Daniel Ponce de Leon (2010), MLB pitcher
 Henry Corrales (2004), Featherweight mixed martial artist currently competing in Bellator MMA

References

1960 establishments in California
Education in La Mirada, California
High schools in Los Angeles County, California
Public high schools in California
Educational institutions established in 1960